These are the Billboard Hot 100 number one hits of 1960.

That year, 12 acts achieved their first number ones, such as Marty Robbins, Johnny Preston, Mark Dinning, Connie Francis, The Hollywood Argyles, Brenda Lee, Brian Hyland, Chubby Checker, Larry Verne, The Drifters, Ray Charles, and Maurice Williams and the Zodiacs. Percy Faith and The Everly Brothers, despite having most of their previous songs hit number one prior to the creation of the Hot 100, also achieved their first number one songs on the chart. Elvis Presley, Connie Francis, and Brenda Lee were the only acts to have more than one song hit number one.

Chart history

Number-one artists

See also
1960 in music
List of Billboard number-one singles

References

Sources
Fred Bronson's Billboard Book of Number 1 Hits, 5th Edition
Joel Whitburn's Top Pop Singles 1955-2008, 12 Edition
Joel Whitburn Presents the Billboard Hot 100 Charts: The Sixties
Additional information obtained can be verified within Billboard's online archive services and print editions of the magazine.

1960 record charts
1960